The Essentially Ellington High School Jazz Band Competition & Festival is an annual high school jazz festival and competition that takes place every May at Jazz at Lincoln Center in New York City. The festival is aimed at encouraging young musicians to play music by Duke Ellington and other jazz musicians.

Process
Every year Jazz at Lincoln Center transcribes arrangements of Ellington's music and sends them to participating high school band directors in the U.S. and Canada. During the year, band directors are sent a newsletter and given access to online educational materials to help with the arrangements. Students can email Jazz at Lincoln Center for help and send recordings of their band's finished performances to the Center for evaluation. These recordings can also count as applications to the Essentially Ellington High School Jazz Band Competition & Festival in New York City. Fifteen top bands are invited to the festival, which occurs every May at Frederick Rose Hall in Jazz at Lincoln Center. The festivals ends with an awards ceremony for the top three bands, then a concert by the Jazz at Lincoln Center Orchestra led by Wynton Marsalis. 

In 2013 a new selection process was introduced, under which the top three bands from five national regions compete in New York City. Another major change made that year was the opening up of the main competition to allow conglomerate bands (extra-curricular bands composed of students from more than one school, often sponsored by local performing arts organizations) to compete directly with the bands affiliated with schools, instead of one conglomerate band being chosen to appear outside the competition as a special guest in an exhibition performance, as was the case previously. 

The 25th annual edition of the competition and festival was scheduled to feature classic Ellington charts re-released once again. It was also announced on “Acceptd”, the official application site, that, due to the 25th anniversary the region system has been eliminated, and a total of eighteen bands will be selected, three more than in years past. The disbanding of the regional system was a one-year-only event, while the increase in the numbers of bands selected remains ambiguous with regards to its permanence. However, due to concerns regarding the COVID-19 virus, Jazz At Lincoln Center announced that the “in person” aspects of the event were cancelled, with Wynton Marsalis presenting a Q&A session on the day of the festival, jam sessions, clinics, sectionals, concerts, and even the traditional cheer tunnel all being held virtually. No winners were announced, although honors to individual soloists and sections were given.

Also present for the first time in 2020 were five international youth jazz orchestras, from Japan, Scotland, Australia, Spain, and Cuba.

While the 2021 festival was originally scheduled to be an in-person event featuring music of pivotal arranger and pioneering electric guitarist Eddie Durham alongside the traditional Duke Ellington musical releases. However, the course of the COVID-19 pandemic meant that this arrangement simply wasn't feasible. The festival pushed back the release of new music until the 2021-2022 school year, and encouraged participating schools to submit one song from the entire Essentially Ellington library in either a synchronous or asynchronous fashion. Submission due dates were pushed back to March and the actual festival to early June. 

The 2021 festival also introduced new rules regarding the submissions of conglomerate bands (extra-curricular bands composed of students from more than one school), a previously largely unregulated field. The festival provided and official definition of conglomerate bands, stating that they need to follow a specific course of study, as well as a scope and sequence, all in addition to weekly rehearsals and scheduled public performances. All-Star, All-State, and All-Region bands are barred from competition, as are bands created for the sole purpose of competing in Essentially Ellington.

Background
When the program began in 1995, it was offered only to school bands in New York City. During the next few years, the program grew to include schools in all U.S. states and Canada. Over 4000 schools have received materials.

Beginning in early 2006, JALC announced the debut of the festival's first regional. The regional festivals are non-competitive and offer high school jazz bands of different levels the opportunity to play Ellington's music while also receiving professional feedback.

Starting in 2008, music by big band composers other than Ellington was used for the first time, three Count Basie selections. In succeeding years they have also released songs by: Benny Carter, Dizzy Gillespie, Mary Lou Williams, Gerald Wilson, Fletcher Henderson, and Benny Golson. 

For the 2013 and 2015 competitions, Essentially Ellington returned to its original format of six Ellington charts. After the finalists are announced, clinicians are sent to each of the finalist schools to provide a jazz workshop and prepare the bands for competition. The clinicians are usually members of the Jazz at Lincoln Center Orchestra. Notable alumni of the competition includes Grammy-nominated trombonist Nick Finzer who serves on the jazz faculty at UNT and founded The Outside The Music record label.

Finalists
Several high school bands from the Seattle area have participated including repeat finalists: Roosevelt; Garfield; Shorewood; Mount Si; Edmonds-Woodway; Mountlake Terrace; Newport and Ballard high schools. In 2008, five of the fifteen bands to compete were from the greater Seattle area. Acknowledging the region's dominance at the competition, Marsalis, tongue only half in cheek, challenged the remaining schools/regions, "to do something about Seattle and Washington."

Alabama
 Virgil I. Grissom High School – Huntsville, Alabama, 1999

Arizona
 Tucson Jazz Institute - Tucson, Arizona, 2010*, 2012*, 2013 (1st), 2014 (1st), 2015 (2nd), 2016 (3rd), 2017 (1st), 2018 (3rd), 2021

California
 Agoura High School – Agoura Hills, California, 2004, 2005, 2006 (H.M.), 2007 (2nd), 2009, 2011, 2015, 2018, 2020, 2021, 2023
 Agoura High School (Jazz A) – Agoura Hills, California, 2007, 2008
 Albany High School – Albany, California, 2010
 Calabasas High School – Calabasas, California, 2003, 2006, 2009
 Esperanza High School – Anaheim, California, 2012
 Los Angeles County High School for the Arts – Los Angeles, California, 2003 (3rd), 2006, 2009
 Orange County School of the Arts - Santa Ana, California 2022 (3rd), 2023
 Rio Americano High School – Sacramento, California, 2001, 2002, 2006, 2007, 2010, 2012 (H.M.), 2013, 2014, 2019, 2020, 2022
 San Diego School of Creative and Performing Arts - San Diego, California, 2016, 2019
 SF Jazz All-Star High School Ensemble – San Francisco, California, 2002, 2003 (H.M.)

Colorado
 Denver School of the Arts – Denver, Colorado, 1999, 2004, 2017(2nd), 2019, 2020

Connecticut
 Connecticut Youth Jazz Workshop – Middletown, Connecticut, 2000, 2002
 Greenwich High School – Greenwich, Connecticut, 1996, 2003, 2007
 Guilford High School – Guilford, Connecticut, 1997, 1998 (H.M.), 1999, 2003
 Hall High School – West Hartford, Connecticut, 1997 (3rd), 1998 (1st), 1999 (2nd), 2000 (1st), 2001 (H.M.), 2002, 2005, 2008, 2011, 2018, 2019, 2021, 2023

Florida
 Community Arts Program – Coral Gables, Florida 2013, 2014, 2015
 Dillard High School – Fort Lauderdale, Florida, 2010 (2nd), 2011 (1st), 2012 (1st), 2013 (H.M.), 2014 (3rd), 2015 (H.M.), 2017 (3rd), 2018 (1st), 2019 (2nd), 2020, 2021
 Douglas Anderson School of the Arts – Jacksonville, Florida, 2004, 2006 (1st), 2008
 Dreyfoos School of the Arts – West Palm Beach, Florida, 1998, 2021
 Howard W. Blake High School – Tampa, Florida, 1999 (H.M.)
 New World School of the Arts – Miami, Florida, 2000 (2nd), 2002 (3rd), 2003 (2nd), 2004 (H.M.), 2005 (1st), 2009 (H.M.), 2010, 2011 (H.M.), 2012 (3rd), 2013, 2015, 2016 (1st), 2020, 2022, 2023
 Osceola County High School for the Arts – Kissimmee, Florida, 2014, 2017, 2018, 2022 (1st), 2023
Tarpon Springs High School – Tarpon Springs, Florida, 2019, 2020
 University High School - Orange City, Florida, 2016

Georgia
 The Lovett School – Atlanta, Georgia, 2000, 2001 (3rd), 2004 (H.M.), 2010

Illinois
 Champaign Central High School – Champaign, Illinois, 2005, 2008, 2012, 2017, 2018, 2021
 DeKalb High School– DeKalb, Illinois, 2008, 2012
 Downers Grove South High School – Downers Grove, Illinois, 2011
 East St. Louis Senior High School – East St. Louis, Illinois, 2011
 Lake Zurich High School – Lake Zurich, Illinois, 2006
 Lyons Township High School – La Grange, Illinois, 2015
 Naperville North High School – Naperville, Illinois, 2000
 St. Charles High School – St. Charles, Illinois, 1998, 2000
 St. Charles East High School – St. Charles, Illinois, 2003
 St. Charles North High School – St. Charles, Illinois, 2004, 2011
 Thornton Township High School – Harvey, Illinois, 2002
 Youth Jazz Ensemble of DuPage – Wheaton, Illinois, 2001 (H.M.), 2008*

Indiana
 Southport High School – Indianapolis, Indiana, 1999
 Whiteland Community High School - Whiteland, Indiana, 2014
 Noblesville High School - Noblesville, Indiana, 2021, 2022

Iowa
 North Scott High School – Eldridge, Iowa, 2009
 Sioux City North High School – Sioux City, Iowa, 2006
 Valley High School – West Des Moines, Iowa, 1999, 2011

Kansas
 Shawnee Mission East High School – Prairie Village, Kansas, 2001, 2006
 Olathe Northwest High School – Olathe, Kansas, 2021

Maryland
 Arundel High School – Gambrills, Maryland, 2001

Massachusetts
 Foxborough High School – Foxborough, Massachusetts, 1997 (1st), 1998 (2nd), 1999 (H.M.), 2000 (H.M.), 2001 (H.M.), 2002, 2003, 2004 (2nd), 2005, 2007 (3rd), 2009, 2010 (3rd), 2011, 2013, 2015, 2016, 2017, 2019 (3rd), 2021, 2022 (2nd), 2023
 King Philip Regional High School – Wrentham, Massachusetts, 2002, 2007 (H.M.), 2010
 Lexington High School – Lexington, Massachusetts, 1998 (H.M.), 1999, 2003, 2006, 2013, 2014, 2015 (3rd), 2016, 2017
 Medfield High School – Medfield, Massachusetts, 2005, 2008, 2012, 2014
 Newton South High School – Newton, Massachusetts, 2018, 2021
 Wellesley High School – Wellesley, Massachusetts, 2005, 2006, 2009, 2011

Michigan
 Byron Center High School – Byron Center, Michigan, 2016, 2017, 2020, 2021, 2022, 2023
 Interlochen Center for the Arts – Interlochen, Michigan, 1998, 2003

Missouri
 Grandview High School – Grandview, Missouri, 2007

Nebraska
 Lincoln Southeast High School – Lincoln, Nebraska, 1999

New Jersey
 Jazz House Kids – Montclair, New Jersey 2013 (2nd), 2014 (2nd), 2016, 2022
 Parsippany High School – Parsippany, New Jersey, 1996
 Newark Academy – Livingston, New Jersey 2012, 2015, 2017 (H.M.), 2018 (2nd), 2019, 2022

New York
 315 All-Stars – Syracuse, New York, 2001 (1st), 2002, 2003 (H.M.)
 Adlai E. Stevenson High School – Bronx, New York, 1996 (3rd)
 Brentwood High School – Brentwood, New York 1996, 1997
 Canandaigua Academy – Canandaigua, New York, 1996
 Celia Cruz Bronx High School of Music - Bronx, NY 2020
 Eastman Youth Jazz Ensemble – Rochester, New York, 2003, 2005*, 2006*
 Ethical Culture Fieldston School – Riverdale, New York, 1996
 Honeoye Falls–Lima High School – Honeoye Falls, New York, 1996 (2nd), 1997 (H.M.), 2004, 2007
 Honeoye Falls-Perinton Jazz Ensemble – Honeoye Falls, NY, 1999
 Kingston High School – Kingston, New York, 2009
 Laurens Central School – Laurens, New York, 1996
 Fiorello H. LaGuardia High School – New York, New York, 1996 (1st), 1997 (2nd), 1998, 1999(1st), 2000 (H.M.), 2002, 2005, 2010
 Miller Place High School – Miller Place, New York, 1996
 Penfield High School – Penfield, New York, 1997, 1998, 1999
 Rochester Area High School Jazz Ensemble – Honeoye Falls, New York, 2000
 Susan Wagner High School – Staten Island, New York, 2023
 West Genesee High School – Camillus, New York, 1997
 Williamsville East High School – East Amherst, New York, 1999, 2007

North Carolina
 Triangle Youth Jazz Ensemble – Raleigh, North Carolina, 2016 (2nd), 2017, 2018, 2019, 2020, 2022, 2023

Ohio
 Columbus Youth Jazz Orchestra – Columbus, Ohio, 2002
 Lakota East High School – Liberty Township, Ohio 2012
 Westerville South High School – Westerville, Ohio, 2004

Oregon
 American Music Program Pacific Crest Jazz Orchestra - Portland, Oregon, 2007*, 2008*, 2009*, 2011*, 2013, 2015 (1st)
 Arts & Communication Magnet Academy – Beaverton, Oregon, 2005

Pennsylvania
 Pennsbury High School – Fairless Hills, Pennsylvania, 1997 (H.M.)
 State College Area High School – State College, Pennsylvania, 1998, 1999, 2006, 2009
 Upper Darby High School – Upper Darby, Pennsylvania, 1998

Rhode Island
 Barrington High School – Barrington, Rhode Island, 1998, 2000

Tennessee
 Hume-Fogg High School – Nashville, Tennessee, 1998, 2010
 Memphis Central High School - Memphis, Tennessee, 2020, 2021

Texas
 Carroll Senior High School – Southlake, Texas, 2007, 2010, 2014, 2018, 2020, 2021
 High School for the Performing and Visual Arts – Houston, Texas, 1999 (3rd)
 Plano Senior High School – Plano, Texas, 2005, 2010
 Plano West Senior High School – Plano, Texas 2017, 2020, 2021, 2022, 2023
 Stephen F. Austin High School – Austin, Texas, 2008
 Temple High School – Temple, Texas, 2004, 2011

Utah
 Crescent Super Band – American Fork, Utah, 2016

Virginia
 Chantilly High School – Chantilly, Virginia, 1997, 1998
 McLean High School – McLean, Virginia, 1997

Washington
 Ballard High School – Seattle, Washington 2012, 2018
 Battle Ground High School – Battle Ground, Washington 2006 (2nd)
 Bothell High School - Bothell, Washington 2022, 2023
 Edmonds Woodway High School – Edmonds, Washington, 2003, 2007, 2010, 2013, 2017
 Garfield High School – Seattle, Washington, 1999 (H.M.), 2000 (H.M.), 2002 (2nd), 2003 (1st), 2004 (1st), 2005, 2006 (3rd), 2007, 2008 (2nd), 2009 (1st), 2010 (1st), 2013, 2014 (H.M.), 2015, 2016, 2019, 2020, 2023
 Kentlake High School – Kent, Washington, 2001
 Kentridge High School – Kent, Washington, 1999
 Mead High School – Spokane, Washington, 2004, 2007
 Mount Si High School – Snoqualmie, Washington 2014, 2015, 2016, 2017, 2019, 2020, 2022
 Mountlake Terrace High School – Mountlake Terrace, Washington, 2000, 2002 (H.M.), 2005 (3rd), 2008, 2011 (3rd), 2012, 2017, 2018, 2020
 Newport High School – Bellevue, Washington, 2001, 2006, 2009
 Roosevelt High School – Seattle, Washington, 1999, 2000 (3rd), 2001 (2nd), 2002 (1st), 2004, 2005 (2nd), 2006, 2007 (1st), 2008 (1st), 2009 (2nd), 2010 (H.M.), 2011 (2nd), 2012 (2nd), 2013 (3rd), 2014, 2015, 2016, 2018 (H.M.), 2019 (1st), 2020, 2021, 2022, 2023
 Seattle Jazzed Ellington Ensemble Seattle, Washington, 2020
 Shorewood High School – Shoreline, Washington, 2000, 2001, 2005 (H.M.), 2008 (H.M.)
 South Whidbey High School – Langley, Washington, 2008

West Virginia
 Fairmont Senior High School – Fairmont, West Virginia, 1997

Wisconsin
 Badger Union High School – Lake Geneva, Wisconsin, 2009, 2012, 2013
 Beloit Memorial High School – Beloit, Wisconsin, 2009, 2012, 2013, 2014, 2015, 2016, 2018 (H.M.), 2019, 2020, 2022, 2023
 North High School – Eau Claire, Wisconsin 2012
 Memorial High School – Eau Claire, Wisconsin, 1999, 2001, 2002, 2005, 2008, 2009 (3rd), 2010
Middleton High School – Middleton, Wisconsin, 2019
 Pulaski High School – Pulaski, Wisconsin, 2001
 Sun Prairie High School – Sun Prairie, Wisconsin, 1998 (3rd), 2000, 2001, 2004 (3rd), 2008 (3rd), 2011, 2013, 2014, 2015, 2016, 2017, 2018, 2019
 Sun Prairie West High School – Sun Prairie, Wisconsin, 2023
 Wauwatosa East High School – Wauwatosa, Wisconsin, 2010

Canada
 River East Collegiate – Winnipeg, Manitoba, Canada, 2003, 2004, 2007, 2008, 2011

Community Band Winner

Composition Contest
In 2013, the Gerhard W. Vosshall Student Composition/Arranging Contest was added to the festival following a donation from the Vosshall family made in Gerhard's honor. The contest was renamed the "Dr. J. Douglas White Student Composition and Arranging Contest" in 2016. Each year, a winning composition is chosen from submissions sent from the US and Canada and is performed by the Jazz at Lincoln Center Orchestra. The winning composer receives a cash prize, a trip to the competition in order to conduct their piece and a composition lesson. The lesson was originally with Ellington historian David Berger, but shifted to JLCO saxophonist Ted Nash in 2015.

See also
Jazz at Lincoln Center

References

External links
 Official site

Jazz festivals in the United States
Lincoln Center
Music of New York City
Music competitions in the United States
Jazz in New York City
Jazz festivals in New York City